Kribbella catacumbae is a species of bacteria in the genus Kribbella. It was discovered on the walls of Roman catacombs in 2008.

See also
 Kribbella sancticallisti
 Rubrobacter - found in catacombs (see Catacombs#Bacteria)

References

External links
Type strain of Kribbella catacumbae at BacDive -  the Bacterial Diversity Metadatabase

Propionibacteriales